Sommaren 85 is a 2020 Swedish dramedy-series broadcast on SVT.

The series plot is about the summer of 1985 in the fictitious Swedish village of Braxinge where a "sausage party" sets several things in motion that will change the lives of Åsa and her daughter Lena forever.

Cast
Elina Sätterman – Lena
Emma Broomé – Åsa Westerlund
Lotta Tejle – Barbro Westerlund
Mats Blomgren – Stickan Westerlund
Kajsa Ernst – Ju-Anita
Klara Kry – Sussi
Morgan Alling – Janne
Gustav Berghe – Finn-Magnus
Kim Halén – Max
Anton Lundqvist – Örjan
Mattias Nordkvist – Grizzly
Staffan Ling – Allan Klevenbrandt
Eric Ericson – Frank

References

2020 Swedish television seasons